Mar Thoma College is an institution of higher education located in Tiruvalla in the south Indian state of Kerala. The college is affiliated with Mahatma Gandhi University and offers 12 undergraduate, 10 post-graduate, and 7 doctoral programmes. The college is accredited by the National Assessment and Accreditation Council (NAAC).

Overview
Mar Thoma College was founded by the Mar Thoma Syrian Church of Malabar in 1952 as a junior college offering two intermediate courses. Alexander Mar Thoma was the school's founding principal. It has been affiliated with the University of Kerala since its inception. When Mahatma Gandhi University was established in 1983, the college was brought under its affiliation and two years later, two of the departments of the college, English and zoology, were recognized as research centres to commence doctoral programmes. In 1998, the National Assessment and Accreditation Council extended accreditation to the college, the first college in Kerala and one of the first colleges in India to receive the NAAC accreditation. The college was re-accredited with A Grade in 2005 and the central government accreditation agency retained the grading at A during its reassessment in 2012. The NAAC has extended the period of accreditation to seven years(till 2019) as the college has obtained the highest possible grades in two consecutive accreditations.

The college is a member of United Nations Academic Impact (UNAI) and All India Association of Christian Higher Education. It hosted the 29th Kerala Science Congress in 2017. Dr. Alexander Mar Thoma Metropolitan (Rev.MG Chandy), Padma Shri Samuel Paul( an Indian scholar, economist, former visiting professor at Harvard Business School, advisor to the World Bank and the UN Commission on Transnational Corporations), Dr. A.V Varghese, Dr. J.V. Vilanilam (both former Vice Chancellors) were among the distinguished faculty of the college.

The college campus is located in Kuttappuzha, a small hamlet in Tiruvalla, known for the Sreevallabha Temple, one of the oldest temples in Kerala. Tiruvalla town is 2 km away and the distance to the state capital, Thiruvananthapuram and the commercial city of Kochi are 120 km and 89 km respectively. The campus is near to many centres of pilgrimage such as Niranam Church, Kaviyoor Mahadevar Temple and Parumala Church, besides the Sreevallabha Temple.

The college is coeducational and has a student strength of about 1800. The administration is under a manager deputed by the Mar Thoma Syrian Church and is headed by a principal who is assisted by 80 teaching and 45 non teaching staff. It offers 12 under graduate, 10 post graduate, seven doctoral and many other  non formal programmes.

Departments
The academics is sectioned into independent departments based on subjects of instruction such as English, Malayalam, Hindi, Mathematics, Statistics, Physics, Chemistry, Botany, Zoology, Economics, History, Political Science, Commerce, Physical Education and Bio-Sciences (SF). Non teaching programmes have a separate department handing them while non formal computer educational programmes are handled by Mar Thoma College Institute of Computer Sciences, a subsidiary functioning under the same management.

Notable alumni
John Abraham, film director, short story writer, and screenwriter
Mathew T. Thomas, Minister for Water Resources, Government of Kerala
Nayanthara, actress
Blessy, film director and writer
Kaviyoor Sivaprasad, National Film Award Winner, film director, writer, and actor
Sidhartha Siva, National Film Award Winner, film director, writer, and actor
K. C. Joseph, Opposition Deputy leader, Kerala Assembly
K. George Thomas, Shanti Swaroop Bhatnagar Awardee
Vishnu Vinod, Kerala and Royal Challengers Bangalore wicketkeeping batsman
Prasanth Alexander, Actor, Malayalam Film Industry

See also
 List of colleges affiliated with Mahatma Gandhi University

References

External links
 

Christian universities and colleges in India
Arts and Science colleges in Kerala
Colleges affiliated to Mahatma Gandhi University, Kerala
Universities and colleges in Pathanamthitta district
Educational institutions established in 1952
Mar Thoma Syrian Church
1952 establishments in India